Rodney Elliot (born 17 December 1977 in Rotterdam) is a Dutch footballer who played for Eerste Divisie club FC Dordrecht during the 1996-2001 football seasons.

References

External links
voetbal international profile

Dutch footballers
Footballers from Rotterdam
FC Dordrecht players
Eerste Divisie players
1977 births
Living people
Association footballers not categorized by position